Tête Blanche (lit. White Head, from French) is a mountain of the Pennine Alps on the Swiss-Italian border. Its summit (3,710 metres) is the tripoint between the valleys of Hérens, Mattertal (both in Valais) and Valpelline (in the Aosta Valley), thus forming the linguistic tri-point between  French, German, and Italian-speaking areas.

Tête Blanche is generally the high point of the Haute route between Chamonix and Zermatt and the annually race Patrouille des Glaciers. Tête Blanche lies within a few kilometres of the Matterhorn and Dent d'Hérens on the east.

References

External links
 Tête Blanche on Hikr

Mountains of the Alps
Alpine three-thousanders
Mountains of Switzerland
Mountains of Italy
Italy–Switzerland border
International mountains of Europe
Mountains of Valais